Czerwone Bagno  is a village in the administrative district of Gmina Jeleniewo, within Suwałki County, Podlaskie Voivodeship, in north-eastern Poland. Its name means "red bog".

References

Czerwone Bagno